Halloween II may refer to:

 Halloween II (1981 film), the first sequel to Halloween (1978)
 Halloween II (2009 film), the sequel to Halloween (2007)
 Halloween II (soundtrack), the soundtrack to the 1981 film
 "Halloween II" (Brooklyn Nine-Nine), 4th episode 2nd season
 "Halloween II", a song by The Misfits from the 1981 "Halloween" single
 "Halloween II", a song by Samhain from the 1986 album Samhain III: November-Coming-Fire

See also
 Halloween (2018 film), a direct sequel to the 1978 film Halloween also called "Halloween II 3" during production
 Halloween (franchise), the media franchise spawned from the 1978 film
 Halloween (disambiguation)